Wynne Richards (born 10 June 1950) is a former male international lawn and indoor bowler.

Bowls career
Wynne was born in Merthyr Tydfil in Wales and began bowling at his father's club Troedyrhiw. He moved to London and represented England before winning the 1984 and 1986 English National Championship singles and the singles at the British Isles Bowls Championships in 1985. He has also won the British Isles indoor singles title in 1985.

His best achievement on the international stage came when he finished runner up to Hugh Duff in the 1988 World Indoor Bowls Championship. In addition he won two bronze medals in the triples and fours at the 1988 World Outdoor Bowls Championship.

He represented England in the fours event, at the 1994 Commonwealth Games in Victoria, British Columbia, Canada.

References

English male bowls players
Living people
1950 births
Bowls players at the 1994 Commonwealth Games
Commonwealth Games competitors for England